The  is an electric multiple unit (EMU) train type operated by the private railway operator Nankai Electric Railway in Japan since 1992.

Operations 
The 1000 series is used mainly on Nankai Line commuter services singly or coupled with 8000 series or 8300 series EMUs. 12 vehicles (one each of a two-car, four-car and six-car sets) are allocated for service on the Koya line.

Formations 
, the fleet consists of six two-car sets (1001 to 1010), one four-car set (1051), and ten six-car sets (1031 to 1036). All the "Tc" and "Tc1" cars are at the Osaka-Namba end. The sets are formed as follows.

2-car sets 
The first half of the 2-car sets, 1031 to 1033, were part of the first batch which was completed in 1992.

 The "M1" car is fitted with two scissors-type pantographs.

4-car set 
The four-car set was built in 2001 and is designated as 1050 series.

 The "Mc1" car is fitted with two single arm-type pantographs.
 The "M1" car is designated as a "mildly air-conditioned" car.

6-car sets 
The first three of the 6-car sets, 1001 to 1003, were part of the first batch which was completed in 1992.

 The "Mc1" and "M2" cars are fitted with two scissors-type pantographs.
 The "M2" car is designated as a "mildly air-conditioned" car.

Interior 
All cars feature longitudinal seating throughout except in the car ends where there are two rows of seats in a 2+2 configuration which face each other.

History 
These trains are the second rendition of the 1000 series. The original 1000 series, renumbered to the 11001 series in their later years, were all scrapped by 1987.

The sets were refurbished between 2017 and 2020. Works included upgrades to passenger display information and installation of multi-language LCD screens above the car doors inside the trains.

Gallery

References

External links 

 Nankai rolling stock information 

Electric multiple units of Japan
Train-related introductions in 1992
Nankai Electric Railway rolling stock
1500 V DC multiple units of Japan
Tokyu Car multiple units